The Westcoast Curling Classic (formerly the Key West Ford Westcoast Curling Classic, the Allied Windows Westcoast Curling Classic and the PriceWaterhouseCoopers Westcoast Curling Classic) was an annual curling tournament, held on Thanksgiving weekend in New Westminster, British Columbia. It was one of the early curling tournaments of the World Curling Tour season. It was cancelled after 12 years on the tour.

Past champions

External links

Former World Curling Tour events
New Westminster
Curling in British Columbia